In organic chemistry, Hantzsch–Widman nomenclature, also called the extended Hantzsch–Widman system (named for Arthur Rudolf Hantzsch and ), is a type of systematic chemical nomenclature used for naming heterocyclic parent hydrides having no more than ten ring members. 
Some common heterocyclic compounds have retained names that do not follow the Hantzsch–Widman pattern.

A Hantzsch–Widman name will always contain a prefix, which indicates the type of heteroatom present in the ring, and a stem, which indicates both the total number of atoms and the presence or absence of double bonds. The name may include more than one prefix, if more than one type of heteroatom is present; a multiplicative prefix if there are several heteroatoms of the same type; and locants to indicate the relative positions of the different atoms. Hantzsch–Widman names may be combined with other aspects of organic nomenclature, to indicate substitution or fused-ring systems.

Prefixes

The Hantzsch–Widman prefixes indicate the type of heteroatom(s) present in the ring. They form a priority series: If there is more than one type of heteroatom in the ring, the prefix that is higher on the list comes before the prefix that is lower on the list. For example, "oxa" (for oxygen) always comes before "aza" (for nitrogen) in a name. The priority order is the same as that used in substitutive nomenclature, but Hantzsch–Widman nomenclature is recommended only for use with a more restricted set of heteroatoms (see also below).

All of the prefixes end in "a": In Hantzsch–Widman nomenclature (but not in some other methods of naming heterocycles), the final "a" is elided when the prefix comes before a vowel.

The heteroatom is assumed to have its standard bonding number for organic chemistry while the name is being constructed. The halogens have a standard bonding number of one, and so a heterocyclic ring containing a halogen as a heteroatom should have a formal positive charge. In principle, lambda nomenclature could be used to specify a non-standard valence state for a heteroatom but, in practice, this is rare.

Stems
The choice of stem is quite complicated, and not completely standardised. The main criteria are:
the total number of atoms in the ring, both carbon atoms and heteroatoms ("ring size")
the presence of any double bonds
the nature of the heteroatoms.
Notes on table:
Heteroatom priority decreases as follows: F,  Cl,  Br,  I,  O,  S,  Se,  Te,  N,  P,  As,  Sb,  Bi,  Si,  Ge,  Sn,   Pb,  B,  Al, Ga,  In,  Tl,  Hg.
Names in parenthesis indicate ending when nitrogen is present.
The parent compound for unsaturated ring systems is the one containing the maximal number of non-cumulated double bonds (known as the mancude ring system).  Compounds with an intermediate number of double bonds are named as the hydrogenated derivatives of the mancude ring.

History
Hantzsch–Widman nomenclature is named after the German chemist Arthur Hantzsch and the Swedish chemist Oskar Widman, who independently proposed similar methods for the systematic naming of heterocyclic compounds in 1887 and 1888 respectively. It forms the basis for many common chemical names, such as dioxin and benzodiazepine.

Notes

References

External links 
 Hantzsch-Widman nomenclature, IUPAC

Chemical nomenclature
Heterocyclic compounds